Alaskan Bush People is an American docudrama-style reality television series that follows the Brown family in an attempt to survive in the wilderness, detached from modern society.  The series premiered on the Discovery Channel on May 6, 2014. Filmed on location in Alaska near Copper Center, Hoonah, and Chichagof Island, with later seasons filmed on location in Okanogan County, Washington, it follows the extended Brown family's life. Although purportedly a genuine reality TV show, it has been criticized for being scripted and/or fake. 

In April 2019, Radar Online learned that the show was renewed for a 10th season. On November 13, the show was renewed for season 11, which premiered on December 4, 2019. Season 12 premiered on August 23, 2020. In August 2020, cast member Bear Brown posted on Instagram saying that the family's home had been destroyed in the 2020 Washington wildfires. Patriarch Billy Brown died at age 68 on February 7, 2021, after suffering a seizure.

Background
The series follows the Brown family of Hoonah, Alaska, as they build lives together off the grid in Alaska.

Episodes

Series overview

Season 1 (2014)

Season 2 (2015)

Season 3 (2015)

Season 4 (2015–16)

Season 5 (2016)

Season 6 (2017)

Season 7 (2017)

Season 8 (2018)

Season 9 (2019)

Season 10 (2019)

Season 11 (2019–20)

Season 12 (2020)

Season 13 (2021)

Season 14 (2022)

Specials

Family members

Billy has a criminal history of horse theft in 1980.
Ami has a criminal history of welfare fraud.

Billy was previously married to Brenda Britt; their daughter, Twila Byars, appeared in the episode "Growing the Wolfpack" (S05E04). It has been suggested that the couple had a second child, Brandy.

Residency issues
On October 3, 2014, following an investigation by the Alaska Department of Revenue, a Juneau grand jury indicted the Browns with 60 counts of first-degree unsworn falsification regarding Permanent Fund Dividend forms for their residency and first- and second-degree theft that took place between 2009 and 2012. 

Billy was charged with 24 of those counts, which occurred from 2010 to 2013 as well as for the theft of more than $21,000 in dividend money for himself and others. The charges meant that the state believed the family spent more than 180 days a year living outside of Alaska and lied about it on their applications.  

On November 18, 2015, Billy and Joshua struck a plea deal for the whole family except Matt and Rain (Matt wasn't living there and didn't file and Rain was too young). They pled guilty for the  rest of the family for lying on PFD forms. Billy and Joshua's punishment for stealing over $21,000 dollars was restitution, fines and 30 days of house arrest at a Juneau hotel.

References

External links

2010s American reality television series
2014 American television series debuts
Discovery Channel original programming
Television shows set in Alaska